This is a list of music-related events in 1810.

Events

April 27 - Ludwig van Beethoven composed one of his most popular compositions piano piece Für Elise
Friedrich Kuhlau leaves Hamburg for Copenhagen to avoid conscription into Napoleon's army.
Work begins on the San Carlo Opera House at Naples.

Classical Music
Ludwig van Beethoven
March for Military Band, WoO 20
Polonaise for Military Band, WoO 21
Ecossaise for Military Band, WoO 22
Ecossaise for Military Band, WoO 23
Bagatelle No. 25 in A minor for piano, "Für Elise", WoO 59
25 Irish Songs, WoO 152
26 Welsh Songs, WoO 155
Egmont, Op. 84, overture and incidental music (first performed, composed 1809)
3 Lieder, Op. 83
String Quartet No. 11 in F minor, "Serioso", Op. 95
 Piano Sonata #26 (Les Adieux)
Joseph Eybler – Die vier letzen Dinge (oratorio)
Johann Nepomuk Hummel – Flute Sonata in D major, Op. 50
Friedrich Kuhlau – Piano Concerto in C major, Op. 7
Etienne Mehul – Symphony No. 4 in E major
Ferdinand Ries 
Violin Concerto No. 1 in E minor, Op. 24
Piano Trio, Op. 28
Bernard Romberg – Trauer-Symphonie, Op .23
Louis Spohr 
Clarinet Concerto No.2, Op. 57
Violin Concerto No.10, Op. 62
Christoph Bernard Verspoell – "Menschen, die ihr wart verloren"
Carl Maria von Weber – Piano Concerto No. 1 in C major, Op. 11

Opera
Johann Nepomuk Hummel – Mathilde von Guise
Gioacchino Rossini – La Cambiale di Matrimonio
Carl Maria von Weber – Silvana

Publications

 Johann Christoph Kuhnau – Die blinden Tonkünstler

Births
February 3 – Ludwig August Frankl, lyricist and poet (died 1894)
February 5 – Ole Bull, Norwegian violinist (died 1880)
February 22 – Frédéric Chopin, composer, pianist (died 1849)
February 8 – Norbert Burgmüller, composer (died 1836)
March 15 – Carl Linger (died 1862)
May 2 – Hans Christian Lumbye, Danish composer (died 1874)
May 5 – Eugène Cormon, librettist (died 1903)
May 18 – Francesco Maria Piave, Italian librettist (died 1876)
 May 20 – Sara Augusta Malmborg, singer, pianist and painter (died 1860)
 June 7 – Friedrich Julius Hammer, poet and librettist (died 1862)
June 8 – Robert Schumann, composer (died 1856)
June 9 – Otto Nicolai, composer and conductor (died 1849)
June 17 – Ferdinand Freiligrath, lyricist and poet (died 1876)
June 19 – Ferdinand David, editor and musician (died 1873)
August 6 – Giorgio Ronconi, operatic baritone (died 1890)
August 12 – Alfred Novello, music publisher (died 1896)
September 22 – Paul Barroilhet, operatic baritone (died 1871)
October 18 – Giovanni Matteo Mario, operatic tenor (died 1883)
October 24 – Carl Baermann, composer (died 1885)
November 7 – Ferenc Erkel, opera composer (died 1893)
November 16 – Friedrich Wilhelm Kücken, conductor and composer (died 1882)

Deaths
January 7 – Joseph Lipavsky, composer
March 29 – John Garth, composer (born 1721)
April 8 – Venanzio Rauzzini, castrato singer, composer, pianist and teacher (born 1746)
July 19 – Joseph Stephenson, composer of West Gallery music (born 1723)
November 19 – Jean-Georges Noverre, ballet master (born 1727)
November 27 – Francesco Bianchi, opera composer (born 1752)
date unknown 
Margaretha Christina Åbergsson, ballet dancer
Anna Davia, opera singer (born 1743)
Domenico Fischietti, composer (born 1725)

References

 
19th century in music
Music by year